Self–Trott–Bickett House is a historic home located at Newton, Catawba County, North Carolina. It was built between 1881 and 1883, and is a two-story brick, double pile house with a rear ell and Italianate and Classical Revival style design elements.  It has a low hipped roof, exterior end chimneys, and a wraparound porch. It was the home of Lawrence Bickett, a grocery wholesaler and brother of North Carolina governor Thomas Walter Bickett.

It was listed on the National Register of Historic Places in 1990.

References

Houses on the National Register of Historic Places in North Carolina
Houses completed in 1883
Italianate architecture in North Carolina
Neoclassical architecture in North Carolina
Houses in Catawba County, North Carolina
National Register of Historic Places in Catawba County, North Carolina